The 2000 Triple J Hottest 100, announced in January 2001, was the eighth such countdown of the most popular songs of the year, according to listeners of the Australian radio station Triple J. As in previous years, a CD featuring 37 (not necessarily the top 37) songs was released. The CD featured Queens of the Stone Age's song "Feel Good Hit of the Summer" despite it not making the top 100, hinting that it may have placed at No. 101.

Full list

40 of the 100 songs were by Australian artists (marked with a green background).

Trivia

Scoring songs at #1 and #3, Powderfinger set the current record for best performing pair of songs (ranked by adding their positions). This record was to be equaled by Kings of Leon in 2008. The Offspring held the previous record, with songs at #3 and #4. Powderfinger also became the only act at that point to top the countdown twice, after "These Days" topped the 1999 list. Flume would later equal this record after winning the 2016 and 2022 countdowns.

"Thank You (for Loving Me at My Worst)" by The Whitlams also featured in the 1999 Hottest 100 at #54, as did "Mutha Fukka on a Motorcycle" by Machine Gun Fellatio at #59.

Artists with multiple entries
Three entries
Rage Against the Machine (13, 77, 95)
Two entries
Powderfinger (1, 3)
U2 (2, 94)
Coldplay (5, 63)
Foo Fighters (8, 18)
The Dandy Warhols (10, 49)
28 Days (11, 52)
Machine Gun Fellatio (16, 67)
Green Day (14, 100)
Bodyjar (20, 66)
Limp Bizkit (21, 27)
George (28, 61)
Grinspoon (33, 73)
Gomez (35, 38)
Placebo (39, 47)
Sinéad O'Connor (44, 60)
Skulker (50, 80)
Motor Ace (65, 98)
Killing Heidi (70, 92)
Metallica (79, 84)
Klinger (86, 97)

Top 10 Albums of 2000
Bold indicates winner of the Hottest 100.

CD release

Certifications

See also
2000 in music

Notes

2000
2000 in Australian music
2000 record charts